Piasty Wielkie  is a village in the administrative district of Gmina Górowo Iławeckie, within Bartoszyce County, Warmian-Masurian Voivodeship, in northern Poland, close to the border with the Kaliningrad Oblast of Russia.

History 

The name derives back to the Old Prussian term "paustre" for wilderness and was first mentioned in 1414 as a location of a mill and a settlement of 4 free Old Prussians in the region of Natangia with 27 cultivated and 3 desolate "Haken", a square measure of the Teutonic Knights. 

In 1858 the manor was bought by Bethel Henry Strousberg, a railway pioneer who fell into bankruptcy in 1875.

Population 

1933: 291
1939: 247

References

Piasty Wielkie